Corbeil is a defunct trade name that has been used in bus manufacturing. From 1936 to 1975, J.H. Corbeil was a manufacturer of bus bodies; Les Enterprises Michel Corbeil was a body manufacturer that specialized primarily in school buses, opened from 1985 to 2007. In 2007, the company was acquired out of bankruptcy by Collins Industries and renamed Corbeil Bus Corporation. Serving as the Canadian equivalent of Collins Bus Corporation, manufacturing was shifted from Quebec to Hutchinson, Kansas.

Prior to its 2007 shift to Kansas, Corbeil manufacturing was located in Saint-Lin–Laurentides, Quebec, Canada.

Following the 2013 discontinuation of manufacturer Mid Bus, Collins ended the use of the Corbeil name after 2015 in favor of using its namesake brand on its vehicles across North America.

History

1936-1975: J.H. Corbeil 
Corbeil traces its roots to 1936, when Joseph Henri Corbeil founded J.H. Corbeil. Located in St-Lin-Laurentides, the company was a manufacturer of bodies for trucks and buses, shifting to bus body production in 1956. 

Following the 1960 death of Joseph Corbeil, control of J.H. Corbeil shifted to his sons, including Michel Corbeil. During the late 1960s, the company held nearly two-thirds market share of bus body production in Quebec and eastern Canadian provinces. To accommodate increased demand, J.H. Corbeil introduced a larger manufacturing facility in St-Lin-Laurentides (next door to the first factory). 

In 1975 J.H. Corbeil was sold to the Canadian division of Blue Bird, which was converted to manufacture their products under the "Blue Bird Québec" plant name. However, due to the reducing demand, the company closed the plant in the early 1980s, and consolidated its operations at their main plant near Brantford, Ontario.

1985-2007: Les Enterprises Michel Corbeil 
In 1985, with several business partners in St-Lin-Laurentides, Michel Corbeil founded Les Enterprises Michel Corbeil, Inc. restarting production in the 7,000 square-foot factory founded by his father in 1936. For the first time, Corbeil produced school bus bodies, specializing in bodies for single rear-wheel cutaway van chassis. By the end of 1985, the company produced 77 bus bodies.

By the end of the 1980s, production of Corbeil buses expanded, with the company replacing its 1930s facility with a 130,000 square-foot factory to accommodate demand. In 1990, the company added bodies for dual rear-wheel van chassis for the first time.

In the early 1990s, the company introduced its first full-size buses, the EMC 1st Premier conventional (EMC=Enterprises Michel Corbeil), using an International 3800 chassis (with Ford B800 as an option). In 1993, the EMC3900 was introduced; sharing its International 3900 chassis with the AmTran Genesis, the EMC3900 was a front-engine transit-style bus. For the United States bus market, Corbeil concentrated on its small bus offerings, not selling the 1st Premier or the EMC3900 outside of Canada. For 1994, Corbeil entered a joint venture with Indiana-based manufacturer Carpenter, manufacturing single rear-wheel buses marketed through its deal network (similar to a joint venture between Blue Bird and Girardin); the joint venture lasted through 1998.

In 1995, Corbeil changed its company emblem, shifting from a vertical EMC to a large smiley face on the roofline of the bus, with the design becoming one of the most widely recognized manufacturer emblems in the transportation industry. With the addition of the "smiley face", the EMC 1st Premier was renamed the Corbeil Conventional.

In 2000, Corbeil produced a rear-engine transit-style bus using an International 3000 chassis. Similar in configuration to the AmTran RE, very few examples of the Corbeil Rear Engine were produced; all were sold in Canada.

In 2001, Les Enterprises Michel Corbeil underwent several major changes. Following poor sales, the Corbeil Rear Engine was withdrawn, alongside the EMC3900 front-engine bus. The body of Corbeil minibuses and conventionals underwent several revisions, largely distinguished by the warning light surrounds.

During the early 2000s, Les Enterprises Michel Corbeil struggled to compete. In 1999, Carpenter shifted exclusively towards production of full-size buses, effectively ending its joint distribution agreement with Corbeil (before closing its operations forever in 2001). In the mid-2000s, IC Corporation (the successor to AmTran/Ward) commenced sales of full-size buses in Canada, largely taking the place of the discontinued Corbeil Conventional and EMC3900.

In September 2007, after 22 years of assembly, Corbeil shut down its operations.

2007-2016: Corbeil Bus Corporation 
In late 2007, Les Enterprises Michel Corbeil was acquired by Collins Bus Corporation, with Collins purchasing the assets, designs, naming rights and warranties of Corbeil. In a major change, Corbeil transitioned from a stand-alone manufacturer to a regional product line of Collins Bus Corporation, consolidating headquarters from Quebec to the Hutchinson, Kansas facility of Collins. The parent company of Mid Bus, in 2007, Collins consolidated production of all three bus product ranges in its Kansas facility, with the first American-produced Corbeils assembled before 2008. As the company restarted bus production, Corbeil offered the Collins Bantam product line under the Corbeil Quantum nomenclature.

To minimize internal competition, Collins marketed itself, Mid Bus, and Corbeil in different regions of North America. As before, Corbeil production was marketed primarily in Canada (Quebec and Ontario) and New England. In 2012, the Quantum naming scheme was retired as Collins introduced the NexBus bodyshell for all three of its brands (shifting towards a naming scheme naming buses by function).

During the 2010s, Collins has consolidated from three vehicle brands to one. In 2013, Mid Bus (the final remaining entity of the bus manufacturer Superior) was withdrawn. In 2016, Collins ended the use of the Corbeil brand in Canada in favor of using the Collins brand across North America.

References 

- Coachbuilt.com history and background on Les Enterprises Michel Corbeil

External links 

 Corbeil bus

School bus manufacturers
Bus manufacturers of Canada
Companies based in Quebec
Canadian companies established in 2007